The Skopje Summer Festival is an annual cultural event in Skopje, Republic of North Macedonia. It was established in 1979 and marked its 30th anniversary in 2009. It hosts artists, musicians, entertainers and performers who present their achievements in the spheres of music, fine art, film, theatre and multimedia performance. The festival takes place at numerous locations and open places in the city.

References

Annual events in North Macedonia
1979 establishments in the Socialist Republic of Macedonia
Festivals established in 1979
Summer events in North Macedonia
Festivals in Yugoslavia
Festivals in Skopje